Bafwabaka is a place in the eastern part of the Democratic Republic of the Congo. Bafwabaka is situated in Tshopo Province. There is/was a catholic convent. In the 1964 civil war, all the 46 nuns were kidnapped by Simba rebels and taken to Wamba, and later to Isiro where some of them were killed, amongst others Marie-Clémentine Anuarite Nengapeta.

References

Populated places in Tshopo